Jajarkot District a part of Karnali Province, is one of the seventy-seven districts of Nepal.

Introduction
Jajarkot is one of the districts of Karnali Province in Nepal. Khalanga is its headquarters. It has 3 municipalities and 4 rural municipalities.

Geography and Climate

Demographics
At the time of the 2011 Nepal census, Jajarkot District had a population of 171,304. Of these, 99.2% spoke Nepali, 0.5% Kham, 0.2% Magar and 0.1% other languages as their first language.

In terms of ethnicity/caste, 38.0% were Chhetri, 22.4% Kami, 16.8% Thakuri, 9.0% Magar, 4.6% Hill Brahmin, 4.0% Damai/Dholi, 2.0% Sanyasi/Dasnami, 1.8% Sarki, 0.7% Badi, 0.2% Newar, 0.1% Dhobi, 0.1% Gaine, 0.1% Lohar, 0.1% Raji, 0.1% other Terai and 0.1% others.

In terms of religion, 99.0% were Hindu, 0.9% Christian, 0.1% Buddhist and 0.1% others.

In terms of literacy, 56.9% could read and write, 4.0% could only read and 39.0% could neither read nor write.

Divisions

Municipalities

Rural municipalities

Former towns and villages

 Archhani
 Bhagawati Tol
 Bheri 
 Bhur
 Daha
 Dandagaun
 Dasera
 Dhime
 Garkhakot
 Jagatipur
 Jhapra
 Junga Thapachaur
 Karkigaun
 Khagenkot
 Khalanga
 Kortrang
 Lahai
 Majhkot
 Nayakwada
 Paink
 Pajaru
 Punama
 Ragda
 Ramidanda
 Rokayagaun
 Sakala
 Salma
 Sima
 Suwanauli
 Talegaun
 Thala Raikar
 Munmai

Notable people

Ratna Prashad Sharma Neupane Social worker and Leader of Communist Party of Nepal (Unified Marxist–Leninist) ,   member of Legislature Parliament 1999
Shakti Bahadur Basnet Leader of Nepal Communist Party
 Rajeev Bikram Shah Leader of Nepali Congress
 Dambar Bahadur Singh Central committee member and Leader of Nepal Communist Party CPN UML

See also
 List of Monuments in Jajarkot District
 Zones of Nepal (Former)

References

External links

 
UN map of the municipalities of Jajarkot District

 
Districts of Nepal established in 1962
Districts of Karnali Province